During 2016, tropical cyclones formed within seven different tropical cyclone basins, located within various parts of the Atlantic, Pacific and Indian Oceans. During the year, 140 tropical cyclones formed in bodies of water known as tropical cyclone basins. The costliest and deadliest tropical cyclone in 2016 was Hurricane Matthew, which impacted Haiti, Cuba, Florida, Georgia and the Carolinas, causing US$15.09 billion in damage. Matthew killed 603 people; 546 in Haiti, 47 in United States, 4 in Cuba and Dominican Republic, and 1 in Colombia and St. Vincent.
 
2016 had a slightly above average amount of tropical cyclones forming in the year. The most active basin of the year was the Western Pacific documenting a record 26 named storms. The Eastern Pacific also had an above-average season with 21 named storms forming. The North Atlantic similarly was the first above-average since 2012 with 15 named storms and 7 hurricanes forming. The above activity can be blamed on a La Niña pattern which formed during the summer of the year. In the North Indian Ocean was a relatively below-average season which featured four named storms. The Southern Hemisphere had relatively average activity throughout much of the year– with the exception of the Australian region which remained below average because of positive IOD– the other South-West Indian Ocean and South Pacific basins featured above-average seasons. Eight Category 5 tropical cyclones were formed in 2016.

Tropical cyclones are primarily monitored by a group of ten warning centers, which have been designated as a Regional Specialized Meteorological Centre (RSMC) or a Tropical Cyclone Warning Center (TCWC) by the World Meteorological Organization. These are the United States National Hurricane Center (NHC) and Central Pacific Hurricane Center, the Japan Meteorological Agency (JMA), the Indian Meteorological Department (IMD), Météo-France (MFR), Indonesia's Badan Meteorologi, Klimatologi, dan Geofisika, the Australian Bureau of Meteorology (BOM), Papua New Guinea's National Weather Service, the Fiji Meteorological Service (FMS) as well as New Zealand's MetService. Other notable warning centers include the Philippine Atmospheric, Geophysical, and Astronomical Services Administration (PAGASA), the United States Joint Typhoon Warning Center (JTWC), and the Brazilian Navy Hydrographic Center(BNHC).

Global atmospheric and hydrological conditions

However, overall the event was considered to be one of the three strongest El Nino events since 1950, since there was a number of different ways to measure the strength of an event. The event subsequently started to weaken with sea surface temperature anomalies across the equatorial pacific decreasing, while predictions about a possible La Niña event taking place during 2016 started to be made.

During May 2016, the El Niño event dissipated as near to below average sea surface temperatures, expanded across the eastern equatorial Pacific Ocean. Atmospheric anomalies over the tropical Pacific Ocean had also weakened and become consistent with ENSO neutral conditions. These anomalies included the traditional and equatorial Southern Oscillation indices becoming near zero, while atmospheric convection, upper and lower level winds all became near average. As a result of this the BoM, NOAA's CPC, IRI, and the JMA, all declared that the record-tying El Niño event had ended in late May/early June.

Summary

North Atlantic Ocean 

The 2016 Atlantic hurricane season officially began on June 1, 2016. It was an above average season and the most active since 2012, producing a total of 15 named storms, 7 hurricanes, and 4 major hurricanes. The first storm, Hurricane Alex, developed on January 12, while the final system, Hurricane Otto, made a crossover to the Eastern Pacific on November 25. The higher-than-normal activity was attributed to many factors. Most significantly, one of the strongest El Niño events recorded in history rapidly dissipated, transforming to cool-neutral conditions across the Pacific in late summer. This led to warmer than normal sea surface temperatures across the Atlantic, though the subtropical regions were slightly cooler than normal; slightly lower than normal sea level pressures; and reduced wind shear, especially in the Caribbean, which had experienced record values of wind shear in the past recent years. Moisture levels, however, were anomalously dry, which likely prevented some of the storms from becoming significant hurricanes. Steering currents had also been different from past years, which had previously had a trough of low pressure dominating the East Coast of the United States.  The tropical cyclones of this season caused about $16.1 billion in damage and at least 748 deaths, being the costliest season since 2012, the deadliest since 2008. The Atlantic hurricane season officially ended on November 30, 2016. The season's activity was reflected with an accumulated cyclone energy index of 141 units, which was well above the 1981–2010 median of 92, as well as the highest value since 2010.

The year opened up with an anomalous storm in January: Hurricane Alex, the first such system to develop in January since 1938. Activity picked up at the end of May into June, with three consecutive tropical storms: Bonnie, Colin, and Danielle. The latter two were the earliest third- and fourth-named storms on record. July saw no storm development for the first time in four years, however. August saw the formation of five tropical cyclones, including Earl, Fiona, Gaston, Eight, and Hermine. A Category 1 hurricane, Earl wrought tremendous damage in Belize and Mexico. With 81 lives lost in Mexico during the passage of Earl, it was the deadliest Atlantic hurricane in the country since 2005. On September 1, Hermine struck the Florida Peninsula as a Category 1 hurricane, ending an 11-year drought of hurricane landfalls in the state, which began after Hurricane Wilma in October 2005.

September featured another five tropical cyclones: Ian, Julia, Karl, Lisa, and Matthew, the latter of which persisted into October. Matthew proved to be the most significant storm of the season, becoming the first Category 5 hurricane in the Atlantic since Hurricane Felix in 2007, and, with a death toll of over 600, it was the deadliest in the Atlantic basin since Hurricane Stan in 2005. It subsequently struck Haiti as a Category 4 hurricane, and inflicted catastrophic damage across the impoverished nation. Matthew also caused extensive damage in Cuba, the Bahamas, and the Southeastern United States. Concurrently, Hurricane Nicole meandered south of Bermuda for more than a week before making a direct hit on the territory as a major hurricane. The next four weeks were quiet, until Hurricane Otto formed in the southwestern Caribbean during late November. Otto eventually became the latest-forming major hurricane in the Atlantic basin on record, surpassing a storm in 1934. After striking Nicaragua and becoming the first hurricane on record to pass over Costa Rica, Otto – the final tropical cyclone of the season – then emerged into the Eastern Pacific basin on November 25, the first such occurrence since Hurricane Cesar–Douglas in 1996.

Eastern & Central Pacific Oceans 

The season was tied as the fifth-most active season on record, alongside the 2014 season. Throughout the course of the year, a total of 22 named storms, 13 hurricanes and six major hurricanes were observed within the basin. Although the season was very active, it was considerably less active than the previous season, with large gaps of inactivity at the beginning and towards the end of the season. It officially started on May 15 in the eastern Pacific, and on June 1 in the central Pacific; they both ended on November 30. As illustrated by Hurricane Pali, which became the earliest Central Pacific tropical cyclone on record, the formation of tropical cyclones is possible at any time of the year. Although Pali formed in January, the season kicked off to a very inactive start; for the first time since 2011, no tropical depressions or storms formed during the month of May, and no named storms formed during June since 2007.

Agatha formed on July 2, the latest first named storm in the eastern Pacific proper since 1969. Despite this, the season set a record for the most number of storms during the first half of July. When Georgette formed on July 21, it became the seventh named storm to form in the month of July; equaling the previous record set in 1985 and 2015 for the most active July since reliable records began. And when Frank became a hurricane (after Georgette did so), it marked a record-high 5 hurricanes in July. Finally, Howard formed on July 31, however, was not named until August 1, one named storm shy of the record. Despite that, the season tied the record set in 1985 with the most named storms in July. Activity in August was slightly less active than July. Lester and Madeline threatened the Big Island at hurricane strength. Lester passed north of the islands, Madeline brought some rain as the storm dissipated south of Hawaii. Javier and Newton followed similar paths close to the Mexican coast, with both making landfall in the Baja California Peninsula in August and early September respectively. After Newton led off September; Hurricanes Orlene, Paine and Tropical Storm Roslyn followed forming far from land. Hurricane Ulika became the first tropical cyclone on record to cross 140°W three times; it also became the first named storm in the Central Pacific basin since Pali back in January. Ulika was the first storm since Ela in 2015 to form in the Eastern Pacific, but not be named until entering the Central Pacific. After an unusually quiet October, Hurricane Seymour became the sixth major hurricane of the season, as well as the strongest. Tropical Storm Tina formed close to the coast of Mexico in mid-November. In late November, Tropical Storm Otto entered the basin from the Atlantic, becoming only the eighteenth cyclone to do so; however, it dissipated quickly due to unfavorable conditions.

Western Pacific Ocean 

The 2016 season is considered to have been the fourth-latest start for a Pacific typhoon season since reliable records began. It was an average season, with a total of 26 named storms, 13 typhoons, and six super typhoons. Despite the season's late start, the 2016 season was a normal and active season with a total of 53 tropical depressions, of which 26 became tropical storms. After five months of inactivity, the first tropical depression developed on May 26, making it the fifth-latest season for a system to form. According to existing records only four other seasons started later—the 1973, 1983, 1984, and 1998 seasons. Tropical activity throughout the basin became marginally favorable for development, and two tropical depressions developed during June. On July 3, Nepartak became the first named tropical storm, making it the second-latest first named storm on record. Nepartak's naming ended a 199-day period (from December 17, 2015, to July 2, 2016) during which no named storm was active within the basin; this period tied the 199-day period from December 22, 1997, to July 8, 1998. Nepartak reached Category 5 super typhoon intensity before making landfall in Taiwan and East China, causing a total of US$1.52 billion of damage. In late July, Tropical Storm Mirinae reached its peak intensity while making landfall over Red River Delta in Northern Vietnam. The storm caused a total of US$334 million of damage in Hainan and Vietnam. Later, Nida reached near typhoon strength; it affected the Philippines, South China and Vietnam, but its damage was lower than that of Mirinae. The season became more active in August, with 7 named storms. Except Dianmu, which affected South China, Indochina, all of the tropical cyclones in August affected Japan and the Russian Far East. By the end of August, three storms (Chanthu, Lionrock and Kompasu) had hit the Japanese island of Hokkaidō, the most since 1951. Lionrock was a large, powerful, long-lived and erratic tropical cyclone which caused significant flooding and casualties in North Korea and Japan in late August.

In September, Typhoon Meranti became the strongest typhoon in terms of pressure since Typhoon Megi in 2010, as well as the strongest typhoon in terms of sustained winds since Typhoon Haiyan in 2013, and the second-strongest tropical cyclone worldwide in 2016, only behind Cyclone Winston, in terms of pressure. Typhoon Megi reached its peak intensity as a Category 3 typhoon while making landfall over Taiwan. Both Meranti and Megi made landfall in  Fujian, China, and they caused a total of US$3.6 billion of damage. Rai became a weak tropical storm before it made landfall in Vietnam, Laos and Thailand in mid-September, causing flooding and moderate damage. Typhoon Malakas impacted Japan with a total of nearly $740 million of damage as a Category 4 typhoon. In late September and early October, Typhoon Chaba reached Category 5 super typhoon intensity and became the strongest tropical cyclone to make landfall in South Korea since Sanba in 2012. Chaba also caused 7 deaths in the country. A tropical depression formed east of the International Date Line on October 3, and entered the basin before developing into Typhoon Songda. Songda struck the Pacific Northwest region of the United States and Canada as a powerful extratropical cyclone. Severe Tropical Storm Aere affected parts of Southeast Asia in mid-October, including the worst flooding in Vietnam since 2010, causing a total of US$209 million of damage. Later, Typhoon Sarika became a powerful typhoon, and affected the Philippines, China and Vietnam, causing severe damage as well as severe flooding in southern China. After Sarika, Typhoon Haima reached Category 5 super typhoon strength before impacting the Philippines and China, causing a total of US$1.93 billion in damages. Haima was the most severe tropical cyclone to affect Hong Kong in October since 1995. In early November, a tropical depression made landfall in Southern Vietnam and caused heavy flooding throughout central and southern Vietnam, causing moderate damage. In late December, Nock-ten became the strongest Christmas tropical cyclone on record anywhere in the world since at least 1960 in terms of 1-minute sustained winds, before impacting the Philippines.

North Indian Ocean 

The 2016 season was the deadliest season since 2010, killing more than 400 people. The season was an average one, seeing four named storms, with one further intensifying into a very severe cyclonic storm. The season officially started with the formation of Cyclone Roanu over in the Bay of Bengal on 17 May. The beginning of June witnessed no storms, although many low-pressure areas formed over Bay of Bengal, but none of them intensified into a depression, due to a very strong southwest monsoon. At the end of June, Depression ARB 01 formed, but weakened within two days. July witnessed no storms until a deep depression formed in August, under the influence of an upper air cyclonic circulation over Gangetic West Bengal. However, multiple low-pressure areas developed over the Bay of Bengal, with Cyclonic Storm Kyant forming in October and Cyclonic Storm Nada in November. Due to the presence of warm sea surface temperatures, Very Severe Cyclone Vardah formed in December.

South-West Indian Ocean

January–June 

Five named storms were formed, including one which was unnamed and another one was crossed from the Australian region. Corentin formed on January 20. In February, the basin became somewhat active with Daya forming, and Uriah entering the basin days later. Emeraude formed in March, quickly peaking at intense tropical cyclone strength, before quickly weakening. Moderate Tropical Storm 07 formed at the end of March. In April, the season began to wind down. Very Intense Tropical Cyclone Fantala formed near the end of the month, and reached peak intensity as the strongest tropical cyclone recorded in the basin in terms of sustained winds. Fantala dissipated on April 24, ending the season.

July–December 

Two systems were formed in 2016, in fact was the least active.

Australian Region

January–June  

During the season only three tropical cyclones developed within the Australian region, which meant that the season was considered to be the least active season since reliable records started in 1969. This low activity was partially attributed to the 2014–16 El Niño event, which caused systems to be displaced eastwards into the South Pacific tropical cyclone basin. A positive Indian Ocean Dipole event caused cooler-than-normal waters in tropical eastern Indian Ocean, near Indonesia, which in turn limited development near Western Australia during the first part of the season.

Stan subsequently made landfall on Western Australia and impacted various commodities including oil, natural gas, and iron ore. However, impacts were limited due to the low population of the region. The precursor tropical low to Tropical Cyclone Uriah developed over the Indian Ocean, within a monsoon trough of low pressure during 9 February. The system subsequently developed further and was named Uriah during 13 February, before it moved out of the region during the following day. Tropical Cyclone Tatiana developed into a tropical cyclone, during 11 February while it was located over the Coral Sea. Over the next few days, the system remained over water and dissipated during 15 February after it had produced some powerful, long period swells along Queensland beaches. After Tatiana dissipated four tropical lows occurred in the region before the season ended on 30 April, including the remnant tropical low of Severe Tropical Cyclone Winston.

July–December  

Eight systems and one named storms were formed in 2016.

South Pacific Ocean

January–June 

The season was one of the most disastrous South Pacific tropical cyclone seasons on record, with a total of 50 deaths and $1.405 billion (2016 USD) in damage. Throughout the season, 8 systems attained tropical cyclone status, whilst 5 became severe tropical cyclones. Winston went on to devastate Fiji, causing $1.4 billion (2016 USD) in damage and 44 deaths across the country.

Meanwhile, 06F developed to the north of Wallis Island, but was absorbed by Cyclone Ula. Victor ended the first slew of storms, dissipating on January 24. Following this, the basin was dormant for three weeks; however, a slew of storms began forming in February. Winston led off the month, forming on February 7. Similar to Ula, the storm attained a preliminary peak, weakened, but later rapidly re-intensified into a Category 5 severe tropical cyclone, making landfall near Suva, Fiji, at peak strength. This made Winston the strongest tropical cyclone on record to impact Fiji. Winston then moved southwest, out of the basin, on February 26, dissipating on March 1. Cyclone Tatiana briefly moved into the basin on February 12, but dissipated the next day, as it exited the basin. Cyclone Yalo and a tropical depression followed to this: Yalo dissipated on February 26, while 12F dissipated on March 1. The basin became dormant again as the season wound down. Despite this, Tropical Depression 13F formed on March 19, and dissipated three days later. The basin once again became dormant again, as the end of March neared, until another tropical depression formed in early April. One of the three depressions became Cyclone Zena, which caused more problems to the nearly decimated Fiji. Cyclone Amos formed in late April and moved over Samoa and American Samoa.

July–December  

After a near average but destructive tropical cyclone season during the previous year, the first tropical disturbance of the season developed to the north-northeast of Niue during November 12. However, over the next few months, no named tropical cyclones developed. This was attributed to a number of factors, including a poorly organised South Pacific convergence zone and a predicted La Niña episode not developing.

South Atlantic Ocean  

Three systems and two named subtropical or tropical storms were formed in 2016. On 5 January 2016, the Hydrographic Center of the Brazilian Navy issued warnings on a subtropical depression that formed east of Vitória, Espírito Santo. On the next day, the system strengthened into a tropical depression, and other agencies considered the system an invest, designating it as 90Q; however, on 7 January, the tropical depression dissipated.

A subtropical depression formed southwest of Rio de Janeiro on 15 November 2016. It intensified into a subtropical storm and received the name Deni on 16 November. Moving south-southeastwards, Deni soon became extratropical shortly before 00:00 UTC on 17 November.

An extratropical cyclone entered the South Atlantic Ocean from Santa Catarina early on 4 December 2016. Later, it intensified quickly and then transitioned into a subtropical storm shortly before 22:00 BRST (00:00 UTC on 5 December), with the name Eçaí assigned by the Hydrographic Center of the Brazilian Navy. Eçaí started to decay on 5 December, and weakened into a subtropical depression at around 00:00 UTC on 6 December.

Mediterranean Sea 

Two tropical system were formed in Mediterranean Ocean during 2016. Early on 28 October 2016,  an extratropical cyclone began to develop to the south of Calabria, in the Ionian sea. However, later that day, it began to re-intensify and underwent a tropical transition. It became a tropical storm on 31 October. After passing over Crete, the storm began to quickly weaken, with the storm degenerating into an extratropical low on 1 November. Tropical Storm 90M was also nicknamed "Medicane Trixi" by some media outlets in Europe during its duration. No fatalities or rainfall statistics have been reported for this system that was over open waters for most of the time.

Systems

January

January was above average activity in terms of systems formed, with six tropical cyclones, of which five were named. Hurricane Pali became the earliest tropical cyclone ever recorded in the Pacific Ocean, surpassing Tropical Storm Winona in 1989. The Atlantic hurricane season began with the formation of Hurricane Alex on January 12, making the first Atlantic hurricane to occur in January since Hurricane Alice of 1954–1955. Unrelated to Alex, the formation of Hurricane Pali over the Central Pacific in early January coincided with Alex's development over the Atlantic. This marked the first occurrence of simultaneous January tropical cyclones between these two basins. Severe Tropical Storm Corentin formed off the coast of the Southwest Indian Ocean, while in the South Pacific Cyclone Victor was formed.

February

March

April

May

June

July

August

September

October

November

December

Global effects

See also

 Weather of 2016
 Tropical cyclones by year
 List of earthquakes in 2016
 Tornadoes of 2016

Notes

1 Only systems that formed either on or after January 1, 2016 are counted in the seasonal totals.
2 Only systems that formed either before or on December 31, 2016 are counted in the seasonal totals.3 The wind speeds for this tropical cyclone/basin are based on the IMD scale which uses 3-minute sustained winds.
4 The wind speeds for this tropical cyclone/basin are based on the Saffir–Simpson scale which uses 1-minute sustained winds.5The wind speeds for this tropical cyclone are based on Météo-France which uses gust winds.

References

External links 

Regional Specialized Meteorological Centers
 US National Hurricane Center – North Atlantic, Eastern Pacific
 Central Pacific Hurricane Center – Central Pacific
 Japan Meteorological Agency – NW Pacific
 India Meteorological Department – Bay of Bengal and the Arabian Sea
 Météo-France – La Reunion – South Indian Ocean from 30°E to 90°E
 Fiji Meteorological Service – South Pacific west of 160°E, north of 25° S

Tropical Cyclone Warning Centers
 Meteorology, Climatology, and Geophysical Agency of Indonesia – South Indian Ocean from 90°E to 141°E, generally north of 10°S
 Australian Bureau of Meteorology (TCWC's Perth, Darwin & Brisbane) – South Indian Ocean & South Pacific Ocean from 90°E to 160°E, generally south of 10°S
 Papua New Guinea National Weather Service – South Pacific Ocean from 141°E to 160°E, generally north of 10°S
 Meteorological Service of New Zealand Limited – South Pacific west of 160°E, south of 25°S

Tropical cyclones by year
2016 Atlantic hurricane season
2016 Pacific hurricane season
2016 Pacific typhoon season
2016 North Indian Ocean cyclone season
2015–16 Australian region cyclone season
2016–17 Australian region cyclone season
2015–16 South Pacific cyclone season
2016–17 South Pacific cyclone season
2015–16 South-West Indian Ocean cyclone season
2016–17 South-West Indian Ocean cyclone season
2016-related lists